Servando Puldón (born 21 September 1961) is a Cuban sports shooter. He competed at the 1992 Summer Olympics and the 1996 Summer Olympics.

References

1961 births
Living people
Cuban male sport shooters
Olympic shooters of Cuba
Shooters at the 1992 Summer Olympics
Shooters at the 1996 Summer Olympics
Sportspeople from Havana
Pan American Games medalists in shooting
Pan American Games gold medalists for Cuba
Pan American Games silver medalists for Cuba
Shooters at the 1987 Pan American Games
Shooters at the 1995 Pan American Games
20th-century Cuban people